Pierre Minet (Reims 1909– Paris 1975) was a 20th-century French poet and writer, whose early career is closely associated to the “Grand Jeu” movement and to his devotion to Roger Gilbert-Lecomte. Critics, who have contrasted the small size of his production with its substantive and stylistic quality, recognize in La Défaite, published in 1947 and subtitled “Confessions”, an autobiographical masterpiece, its author's definitive claim to literary fame, that attracted the praise of Artaud (“une sensibilité unique au monde” ["a thoroughly unique sensibility"]) and of Breton ("Celui qui sait parler de la liberté comme il en parle est moins vaincu que quiconque" ["Someone who knows how to speak of freedom as he does is less defeated than anyone"]) - while the great Italian critic and writer Roberto Bazlen declared he had never read "un livre dans lequel l’intolérance est aussi constitutive, et aussi echt (authentique), et aussi éloignée de toute possibilité de compromis..." ["a book so intransigent, so authentic in its rejection of any possibility of compromise..."]. Somehow branded as a "livre-culte", La Défaite has had four editions, the latest one by Allia (2010). Also a playwright, radio producer and journalist, Minet has left a dense diary En mal d’Aurore, Journal 1932-1975.

The corresponding entry  "Pierre Minet" of the Literary Encyclopedia contains a comprehensive summary of Minet's life and works:  [http://www.litencyc.com/php/speople.php?rec=true&UID=13202]

1909 births
1975 deaths
Writers from Reims
20th-century French poets
French male poets
20th-century French male writers